Briggsdale is an unincorporated town, a post office, and a census-designated place (CDP) located in and governed by Weld County, Colorado, United States. The CDP is a part of the Greeley, CO Metropolitan Statistical Area. The Briggsdale post office has the ZIP Code 80611. At the United States Census 2010, the population of the 80611 ZIP Code Tabulation Area was 25,553 including adjacent areas.

History
The town of Briggsdale was established in 1909.  The town was named for Frank N. Briggs, a farmer and one of the founders.  The Briggsdale Post Office opened on August 1, 1910.

Geography

Climate

Demographics

See also

Outline of Colorado
Index of Colorado-related articles
State of Colorado
Colorado cities and towns
Colorado census designated places
Colorado counties
Weld County, Colorado
Colorado metropolitan areas
Front Range Urban Corridor
North Central Colorado Urban Area
Denver-Aurora-Boulder, CO Combined Statistical Area
Greeley, CO Metropolitan Statistical Area

References

External links

Briggsdale @ UncoverColorado.com
Briggsdale @ History Colorado
Briggsdale School
Briggsdale, Colorado Mining Claims And Mines
Weld County website

Unincorporated communities in Weld County, Colorado
Unincorporated communities in Colorado